John Rodgers (born 19 March 1947) is an Irish boxer. He competed in the men's welterweight event at the 1972 Summer Olympics.

References

1947 births
Living people
Irish male boxers
Olympic boxers of Ireland
Boxers at the 1972 Summer Olympics
Male boxers from Northern Ireland
Boxers at the 1974 British Commonwealth Games
Commonwealth Games bronze medallists for Northern Ireland
Commonwealth Games medallists in boxing
Place of birth missing (living people)
Welterweight boxers
Medallists at the 1974 British Commonwealth Games